Ron Roberts is a footballer who played as a winger in the Football League for Wrexham and Tranmere Rovers.

References

1942 births
Living people
Footballers from Wrexham
Association football wingers
Welsh footballers
Wales under-23 international footballers
Wrexham A.F.C. players
Tranmere Rovers F.C. players
Stafford Rangers F.C. players
English Football League players